Richard "Dick" Frank was chairman of the board and chief executive officer of Showbiz Pizza Time from March 1986 to December 2008. He joined the company in 1985.

References

American chief executives of food industry companies
Living people
Year of birth missing (living people)